Norristown was a 19th-century town and trading center on the Arkansas River and, later, an incorporated town on Norristown Mountain in Illinois Township, Pope County, Arkansas, United States. The town merged with Russellville on August 14, 1980.

History
Founded in 1829, the settlement of Norristown was located south of Russellville, on the Arkansas River, upstream and across the river from Dardanelle. Samuel and Susan H. Norris, originally from New Jersey, having settled at Dwight Mission on the Illinois Bayou, subsequently moved to a point on the Arkansas River opposite Dardanelle Rock, giving the place the name of Norristown. The settlement steadily grew over the years until about 300 or 400 people inhabited the area. By 1834, it was a small community that served as the county seat of Pope County until the seat was moved to Dover in 1841 after Yell County was created out of Pope County and Norristown was no longer centrally located in the county. On the bank of the seasonally navigable Arkansas River and on an established mail post road, the town served as a regional trade and shipping center. During the Civil War, heavy equipment for mining and processing niter from a mine in Newton County came by river to Norristown.

The town was laid out in what looked like a capital T. Its two streets were unmarked, but residents referred to them as "River Street" and "Main Street". Its post office, established in 1839 with Samual Norris as postmaster, closed in 1882.

During the 1830s and 40s removal period of eastern Native Americans to the Indian Territory, thousands passed through Norristown, many crossing the river on the ferry located there.

Norristown was active throughout the mid-1800s but by the end of the century, little remained.  With the erratic nature of the Arkansas River and the construction of the Little Rock & Fort Smith Railroad through nearby Russellville, riverboat shipping declined and disappeared as did small riverside shipping and market centers like Norristown. Part of the town caved into the river in an 1898 flood while the rest was converted into farmland. The Norristown Cemetery,  utilized from 1852 to 1934 and listed in the National Register of Historic Places, is the town's last remnant.

The site of the original settlement of Norristown is now the location of Old Post Road Park, a US Corps of Engineers recreational area. The park's name is derived from the first postal route in this part of Arkansas, which ran through Norristown. An 1830 ferry crossed the river from the present-day location of the park's boat ramp.

In the 20th century, an unincorporated community, also called Norristown, developed on and around Norristown Mountain, a 4.5-mile-long ridge between Russellville and the Arkansas River.   Subsequently, incorporated as the town of Norristown, it was consolidated into Russellville on August 14, 1980.

References

External links
 Encyclopedia of Arkansas History & Culture

Unincorporated communities in Pope County, Arkansas
Unincorporated communities in Arkansas